Jana Kask (born 11 November 1991) is an Estonian singer and the winner of Eesti otsib superstaari 2008, the second season of the Estonian version of Pop Idol. In the final she competed against Arno Suislep, winning it by getting 52.9% of the votes. Her first studio album was released in late 2009.

For now she holds the record as being the youngest winner of the Idol series worldwide at the time of her triumph, which was set by Casey Donovan, winner of Season 2 of Australian Idol before. Jana's first single was Leaving You for Me.

Discography

Albums
 2009: Face in the Mirror

Singles
 2008: Leaving You for Me
 2009: Face in the Mirror
 2010: Don't Want Anything
 2011: Feel the Vibe
 2012: Beyond Good And Evil
 2012: Sleep My Little Angel
 2012: Heroes
 2013: Shooting Star

External links

Official Website

1991 births
Idols (TV series) winners
Living people
Estonian pop singers
21st-century Estonian women singers
Eesti Laul contestants